José Franco may refer to:

 José Franco (artist) (1920–2009), Portuguese potter and sculptor
 José Franco (poet) (born 1931), Panama poet and diplomat
 José Antonio Franco (footballer, born 1979), Paraguayan footballer
 José Antonio Franco (footballer, born 1998), Spanish footballer
 José Eduardo Franco (born 1969), Portuguese historian, journalist, poet and essayist
 José Ignacio Franco (born 1981), Spanish footballer Rápido de Bouzas
 José Manuel Franco (born 1957), Spanish politician
 José María Franco (born 1978), Uruguayan footballer for Emelec
 José María Franco (composer) (1894–1971), Basque composer